Kofi Adjorlolo (born March 23, 1956 in Keta) is a Ghanaian actor and producer.

He has been nominated once for Best Actor in a Lead Role at the Ghana Movie Awards, and four times for Best Actor in a Supporting Role, at the Ghana Movie Awards, Africa Movie Academy Awards, and the Africa Magic Viewers Choice Awards. Among the awards he has received are the International Golden Image award from then Liberian President Ellen Johnson Sirleaf, and the Best Cameo Actor at the 2011 Ghana Movie Awards.

Early life and education
Adjorlolo completed AME Zion school in Keta, Ghana and gained admission to Keta Senior High Technical School before obtaining his sixth form Certificate from Ebenezer Secondary school, Dansoman.

Career 
Adjorlolo began his career as a Musician, playing instruments including trumpet and organ. In his twenties, he travelled to Nigeria and played with Nigerian musician Victor Uwaifo of Joromi fame. He has also performed with the legendary Felix Bell. On returning to Ghana, he formed the Osagyefo band, and played with the Dasebre band. He worked as a civil servant and a radio presenter at the Ghana Broadcasting Corporation and Peace FM. He was instrumental in establishing the religious radio station Channel R, and was honoured by radio station HOT 93.9FM in Accra for 30 years of service to the showbiz industry. He joined the Ghana movie industry in 2003.

Filmography (selected)

See also
Ghana Movie Awards

References

External links 
Kofi Adjorlolo on IMDb

Ghanaian male film actors
1956 births
Living people
20th-century Ghanaian male actors
21st-century Ghanaian male actors